SOMED is a conglomerate company based in Morocco. Its active in a range of sectors such as mining, construction material dealership, tourism, real estate development, food processing and Car dealership. Its capital is composed of Mohammed VI's holding company SNI, Emirati private funds and the Moroccan state.

Ownership
In February 2008, the SNI entered in the capital of the company, buying an equivalent of 1.24 billion Dirhams of shares. The partition then became: 
 32.9% SNI
 33.9% Private Emirati funds
 33.25% Trésor Marocain (Moroccan state)

Former Morocco's Minister of the Interior, Mostapha Sahel was the CEO of the firm.

Activities
The SOMED developed the Mazagan Beach Resort, Casino, Golf and Spa which it sold to the state-owned institution CDG in 2010 for an undisclosed amount.

Subsidiaries
The companies official websites mentions the following subsidiaries:
Hotels
Sheraton Casablanca
Hôtel Pullman Marrakech Resort and Spa
Atlas Almohades Casablanca
Atlas Almohades Agadir
Atlas Almohades Tanger
Hôtel Barcelo Fès 
Hôtel Wahate Aguedal Marrakech
Hôtel Atlas Hospitality Morocco Rabat
Real-estate 
SOMED Développement
Diversified 
Zellidja (Rebab company); subsidiaries: 
Al Ain, Fénie Brossette, SFP Zellidja, Atlantis, Africa Palace Maroc, Rebab Company, Delma (owner of Sheraton Casablanca), Daewoo Rabat (owner of Hilton Rabat)
Food Processing and fishing
SOPROLIVES
UMEP
OLICO
Construction, distribution and Industry
SFP Zellidja (Société des Fonderies de Plomb de Zellidja)
Fénie Brossette (Fénie Brossette)
Société de Développement Automobile (Exclusive distributor of Maserati in Morocco)
Education 
Université Internationale de Casablanca (Laureate SOMED Education Holding)

See also
Les Domaines Agricoles
Attijariwafa Bank
SONASID

References

External links
SOMED.ma

Conglomerate companies of Morocco
Food and drink companies of Morocco
Hospitality companies of Morocco
Real estate companies of Morocco
Mining companies of Morocco
Education companies of Morocco
Société Nationale d'Investissement